Faunis gracilis, the narrow striped faun, is a butterfly in the family Nymphalidae. It was described by Arthur Gardiner Butler in 1867. It is found in Sumatra and Malaya in the Indomalayan realm.

References

External links
Faunis at Markku Savela's Lepidoptera and Some Other Life Forms

Faunis
Butterflies described in 1862